Callispa nigricornis, is a species of leaf beetle found in Sri Lanka.

Description
Body length is about 4.50 to 4.80 mm. Body ovate. Head shiny and reddish yellow. Eyes are oval and black. Antennae with red-brown first segment and dark brown other segment. Antennal length is about 1.80 to 2.00 mm. Prothorax shiny and reddish yellow with a length of 9.00 mm. Pronotal disc is convex medially, with distinct foveae covered with coarse punctures. Scutellum pentagonal and shiny. Elytra reddish yellow and shiny. Elytral length is about 3.10 to 3.25 mm. There are ten rows of punctures at each elytron base. Legs and venturm shiny and reddish yellow.

References 

Cassidinae
Insects of Sri Lanka
Beetles described in 1858